Kambayanatham Rangaswami Kanakavalli (born 1918), known professionally as K. R. Chellam, was an Indian actress who appeared in Tamil language films.

Early life 
Kambayanatham Rangaswami Kanakavalli was born in 1918 to a middle-class Iyengar family in Thanjavur. She lost her mother at an early age, so her father Rangaswami, a lawyer, raised her along with her two siblings. Chellam, as she was informally known, dropped out of school early, and married a Bombay-based insurance salesman, later settling there with him. This marriage resulted in two daughters. After the family incurred financial losses due to the insurance salesman's mismanagement, they went to Madras almost penniless.

Career 

Kanakavalli made her film debut with a minor role in Kausalya (1935) to support her family financially. As cinema was considered taboo in India at that time and she did not want her acquaintances to know she was in that profession, she chose her nickname Chellam as her stage name, though her family ultimately learned the truth. The film became a box office bomb and its production company closed, forcing Chellam to continue as an actress to stay afloat. With help from actress T. N. Meenakshi, she was cast in a bigger role in Madras Mail (1936). This film performed well and got Chellam noticed, resulting in her being cast in Balayogini (1937), also a success. Her next film Vanaraja Karzan (1938) received significant media attention because she wore a revealing outfit. Adrishtam (1939), in which she played a lawyer, established her as an actress of "high merit". Her last film was Pattaliyin Vetri (1960). As of September 1990, Chellam was living in Madras with one of her daughters being a doctor.

Filmography

References

External links 

Actresses in Tamil cinema
1918 births